Lythgoe is a surname. Notable people with the surname include:

 Albert Lythgoe (1868–1934), archaeologist and curator of the Metropolitan Museum of Art
 Alf Lythgoe (1907–1967), British footballer 
 Bonnie Lythgoe (born c. 1950), British dancer and theatre producer & director 
 Clive Lythgoe (1927–2006), British musician
 David Lythgoe (born c. 1880), American actor 
 Ian G. Lythgoe (1914–2000), New Zealand accountant and public administrator
 Nigel Lythgoe (born 1949), British dancer, director & producer
 Simon Lythgoe (born late 20th century), British-born film technician and producer

See also 
 Mary Lythgoe Bradford (1930-2022), American writer
 Lithgow (surname)